Salvatore "Sal" Zizzo Jr. (born April 3, 1987) is an American retired professional soccer player who played as a winger or full-back.

Career

Youth and amateur
Zizzo attended Patrick Henry High School, where he played soccer and baseball. As a baseball center fielder, he was a four-year letterman and voted first-team All-CIF his junior year. He also excelled in soccer, he was voted All-CIF honors four years straight (2002–05). He played club soccer for Hotspurs USA (El Cajon, CA), and was a member of his region's Olympic Development Program (ODP) team. Zizzo then went on to play two years of college soccer at UCLA. At UCLA he was an NCSAA/adidas All-American as a freshman in 2005. Zizzo was also selected as Pac10 Freshman Player of the Year the same year. In 2006, UCLA reached the College Cup vs. Santa Barbara in St. Louis.

He finished his career at UCLA with 43 appearances, eight goals, and 14 assists.

During his college years he also played two seasons with senior amateur team Orange County Blue Star in the USL Premier Development League.

Professional
Zizzo left college early and turned professional in July 2007 after a successful U20 World Cup in Canada for the United States. He signed to Bundesliga club Hannover 96, for a three-year contract. Zizzo made his Bundesliga debut for Hannover on May 10, 2008 in a match against Werder Bremen. In October 2009, Zizzo suffered an ACL injury and missed the entire 2009–10 season. During his stay at the club he was a regular starter for the reserve side, Hannover 96 II, appearing in 45 league matches and scoring 8 goals.

On July 21, 2010, Chivas USA acquired Zizzo through a weighted lottery conducted by MLS. Zizzo played in ten games (making one start) over the second half of the season, totaling 254 minutes and one assist. On February 15, 2011, Zizzo was traded by Chivas USA to MLS expansion side Portland Timbers in exchange for allocation money. Zizzo scored his first MLS goal on August 15, 2012 in a 2–2 draw at Toronto FC. On August 31, 2013, Zizzo scored his second career league goal in a 4–2 loss to Real Salt Lake. In three seasons with Portland Zizzo appeared in 60 league matches and scored two goals and assisted on seven.

On December 13, 2013, Zizzo was traded to Sporting Kansas City in exchange for allocation money. On September 23, 2014 Zizzo helped Sporting to a 3–0 victory over Real Estelí in a CONCACAF Champions League match, scoring the third goal of the match.

On December 10, 2014, Zizzo was the ninth pick of New York City FC in the 2014 MLS Expansion Draft. The following day he was traded to local rivals New York Red Bulls in a deal agreed prior to the draft, with Red Bulls goalkeeper Ryan Meara going the other way on a one-year loan. Zizzo made his debut for New York on March 8, 2015 coming on as a second-half substitute in a 1–1 draw at former club Sporting Kansas City. On March 22, 2015 Zizzo started his first match for New York in a 2–0 victory over rival D.C. United at Red Bull Arena. On July 1, 2015 Zizzo scored his first goal for New York,  helping the Red Bulls to a 4–1 victory in the U.S. Open Cup over local rival New York Cosmos. Zizzo ended the season as the club's starting right back and helped New York in capturing the 2015 MLS Supporters' Shield.

On August 15, 2017, Zizzo helped New York to a 3–2 come from behind victory over FC Cincinnati, providing the game winning assist on Bradley Wright-Phillips's goal in the 101st minute which sent New York to their first Open Cup final since 2003.

In January 2018, Zizzo signed as a free agent with Atlanta United FC.

Zizzo announced his retirement from playing professional soccer on May 21, 2019.

Just over six months following his announced retirement, Zizzo returned to professional soccer when he was announced as the first ever signing for USL Championship side San Diego Loyal ahead of their inaugural season in 2020. Following the 2021 season, Zizzo again announced his retirement.

International
Zizzo represented the U.S. at the U18 and U20 levels. He participated in the Lisbon International Tournament and the Milk Cup in Northern Ireland with the U18s in 2005. Zizzo suited up for the United States. U20 National Team in the 2007 FIFA U20 World Cup, starting all five of the team's matches in the tournament and helping the team reach the quarterfinals. He made his senior national team debut on August 22, 2007, in a friendly against Sweden.

Personal life
Zizzo holds both American and Italian citizenship, as both his parents were born in Palermo, Sicily. This helped with negotiating a contract in Europe with Hannover 96. In November 2013 Zizzo married Destiny Moniz. They have three daughters and one son, Capri Kalei born April 27, 2015, Aeri Elalia born on January 6, 2017,  Zuri Meadow born June 29, 2018, and Massi Kailo born June 19 2021.

Career statistics

Honors
New York Red Bulls
MLS Supporters' Shield: 2015

Atlanta United FC
MLS Cup: 2018

References

External links

 
 
 

1987 births
Living people
American soccer players
American people of Italian descent
American expatriate soccer players in Germany
Expatriate footballers in Germany
UCLA Bruins men's soccer players
Orange County Blue Star players
Hannover 96 players
Hannover 96 II players
Fortuna Düsseldorf players
Chivas USA players
Portland Timbers players
Sporting Kansas City players
New York Red Bulls players
Atlanta United FC players
Atlanta United 2 players
San Diego Loyal SC players
University of California, Los Angeles alumni
Soccer players from California
USL League Two players
Bundesliga players
Major League Soccer players
USL Championship players
United States men's under-20 international soccer players
United States men's under-23 international soccer players
United States men's international soccer players
Association football fullbacks
Association football wingers
American expatriate soccer players